Acianthinae is an orchid subtribe in the tribe Diurideae.

See also 
 Taxonomy of the Orchidaceae

References

External links 

 
Orchid subtribes